Uma Shankar Aragriya is a Nepalese politician belonging to the CPN (UML) who served as the Minister of Culture, Tourism and Civil Aviation since 4 June 2021 but was removed from the post by Supreme Court on 22 June 2021 making the tenure of just 18 days and shortest till date. He was also a member of the 1st Federal Parliament of Nepal after winning in 2017 Nepalese general election from Dhanusha 2 constituency. Arglariya formerly a popular leader, is thought to join Nepali Congress as his party, Loktantrik Samajwadi Party went clean swept in Dhanusha district in recent local level election.

Political life 
His father was an active member of Nepali Congress while Agariya also remained in Nepali Congress till 2008 when he went to Madheshi Jana Adhikar Forum, Nepal led by Upendra Yadav with present Vice-president of Nepali Congress Bijay Kumar Gachhadar. In 2009, when the party broke, he came to Madheshi Janadhikar Forum (Loktantrik) led by Bijay Kumar Gachhadar. The party went series of merger in 2017 to form Nepal Loktantrik Forum and finally joined Nepali Congress.

Argariya was the president of Madhesh Province committee of Nepal Loktantrik Forum. Still, he couldn't live long with Gachhadar after the merger with Nepali Congress. He joined FSF-N to contest the election from Dhanusha-2 to get profit out of the legacy of second Madhesh Movement. In 2019, Naya Shakti Party, Nepal and Federal Socialist Forum, Nepal merger to form Samajbadi Party, Nepal. He had a dispute with leadership there and he along with some other HOR members was in contact with Mahesh Basnet to break the party with 40% HOR members from the SP-N political party. An ordinance was brought for the same. Still, this plan was left unsuccessful after Rastriya Janta Party, Nepal and Samajbadi Party, Nepal merged to form Janta Samajbadi Party, Nepal.

After the merger, Argariya sided with Mahantha Thakur faction in the party at various points in time. On 4 June 2021, joined the government as Minister for Culture, Tourism and Civil Aviation. Still, he was removed by the Supreme Court of Nepal on 22 June 2021 making the tenure just 18 days which is the smallest to date in history.

In an interview with Ratopati, he said it was clear that he could even join Nepali Congress as he holds a past there. This is because of increased dissatisfaction within Janata Samajbadi Party, the consensus for the party is thought to have highly decreased among the public in Terai of Nepal. Previously, FSF-N and RJP-N unitedly had contested 2017 election with the promise that they would work to fulfil the demand of Terai. Still, none of the promises was fulfilled and now four years have passed with By-election date fixed. He said, there was no use of Madhesh Based party if they dedicate themself to same leadership against whom they had raised voice to win the election. He said he would leave Mahantha Thakur now after Nepali Congress government would be formed and join as a minister to work for the public. He also yelled that Gachhadar had proposed him to join NC government led by Deuba in 2017. He was also promised to be made member of HOR from proportional list of Nepali Congress.

Electoral history

2017 legislative elections

2013 Constituent Assembly election

References

Nepal MPs 2017–2022
Living people
People from Dhanusha District
Loktantrik Samajwadi Party, Nepal politicians
Nepali Congress politicians from Madhesh Province
Madhesi Jana Adhikar Forum, Nepal politicians
People's Socialist Party, Nepal politicians
1977 births